Stephen Babcock is a Baton Rouge, Louisiana-based trial lawyer.

Early life and education
Stephen Babcock was born in West Monroe, Louisiana. He attended Cedar Creek School in Ruston, Louisiana from kindergarten to seventh grade when family financial issues necessitated his transfer to the public Ruston Jr. High and eventually Ruston High School, where he graduated in 1991. Babcock attended Louisiana Tech University where he earned a Bachelor of Science (BS) degree in marketing, and a Juris Doctor (JD) from LSU Law School.  He was initiated into Sigma Alpha Epsilon fraternity at Texas A&M University.

Early career
Babcock's first job as a lawyer was as an in-house trial attorney for Allstate after he passed the Louisiana bar exam in 2000. One year later, he entered private practice as an associate attorney with McKay Williamson Lutgring & Cochran and soon thereafter opened his own firm, Babcock Law Firm, LLC in March 2003.  Babcock Law Firm was re-branded as Babcock Partners in July 2010.

Legal practice
Babcock has represented a wide variety of clients including injured individuals, small businesses, Fortune 500 companies, Louisiana State University, foreign countries, and the State of Louisiana in civil cases in involving serious personal injuries, contract disputes, insurance coverage disputes, class actions, and shareholder disputes, among others.

In July, 2013, over 200 news sources, including the Associated Press, confirmed that Stephen Babcock was hired by Ducks Unlimited to represent the organization in a high-profile million dollar federal lawsuit stemming from a contract dispute over a New Orleans artist's prints.  Babcock filed four Motions for summary judgment in the United States District Court for the Eastern District of Louisiana on behalf of Ducks Unlimited.  Three of the four motions were granted.  The case resulted in a voluntary dismissal.

In early 2013, Babcock secured over a million dollars for a Louisiana company in a dispute over insurance coverage on a contingency fee basis.

He is Nationally known for a December 2007 case where he got a state judge to agree to postpone a trial scheduled to start on the same day LSU played Ohio State in the 2008 BCS National Championship Game.
He was defending Imperial Casualty Insurance Co. in a lawsuit over a car crash, and requested the delay because he had tickets to the Jan. 7, 2008 game at the Louisiana Superdome in New Orleans. He and other LSU fans had rented out the second floor of a Bourbon Street bar for a pre-game tailgate party.

In court documents requesting the postponement, Babcock famously referred to Ohio State as "Slowhio". He stated that "All counsel to this matter unequivocally agree that the presence of LSU in the aforementioned contest of pigskin skill unquestionably constitutes good grounds" and went on to say that "In fact we have been unable through much imagination and hypothetical scenarios to think of a better reason."  The judge agreed and granted the postponement.

In another high-profile case, Stephen Babcock won an arbitration award of close to $2 million for hotel operator, against the owner of the Hilton hotel they had managed, Baton Rouge Area Foundation's Commercial Properties Realty Trust.

In another high-profile case, Babcock represented and defended the Republic of Bulgaria in its high-stakes tobacco litigation with the state of Louisiana.

In the news

On June 23, 2015, Stephen Babcock posted on Facebook about seeing a young lady rescue an American Flag during a thunderstorm, creating the hashtag #JenaIsAPatriot which went viral.

In January, 2015, Stephen Babcock was named chairman of FuturePAC, the Baton Rouge Area Chamber's political action committee.

In August, 2012 Babcock was included and extensively quoted in an The Advocate (Louisiana) article that discussed individuals who brought their pets to work and its effect in reducing stress at work.

Awards, accolades, and service work
Louisiana State Bar Association's Stephen T. Victory Award

2018 Ducks Unlimited State Chairman.

References

External links
 Babcock Partners, LLC

Louisiana lawyers
Ruston High School alumni
Louisiana Tech University alumni
Louisiana State University alumni
People from Lincoln Parish, Louisiana
1973 births
Living people
Trial lawyers
People from West Monroe, Louisiana